One Man's Fate is a 1940 Finnish drama film directed by Hugo Hytönen and Nyrki Tapiovaara and starring Gunnar Hiilloskorpi, Mirjami Kuosmanen, and Hytönen. It follows the downward spiral of the farmer Paavo after his wife dies in childbirth, her family reclaims their dowry, and he resorts to drinking. It is based on the 1932 novel of the same title by Frans Eemil Sillanpää, who also co-wrote the screenplay with Tapiovaara.

The film was Tapiovaara's last. He left the film unfinished when he—after several rejections due to his left-wing political background—was accepted into the Finnish army and died in the Winter War. The film was finished by the producer Erik Blomberg, Blomberg's wife Kuosmanen, and the actor and director Hytönen.

It was released on 1 September 1940.

Cast
 Gunnar Hiilloskorpi as Ahrolan Paavo
 Mirjami Kuosmanen as Vormiston Alma
 Hugo Hytönen as Vihtori Taatila
 Helvi Järveläinen as Hulda Tiirikka
 Annie Mörk as Granny
 Emmi Jurkka as Tussan Lyyti
 Onni Veijonen as Pietilän Iivari
 Hertta Leistén as Pälä's wife
 Simo Osa as Jaskari
 Jalmari Parikka as Pälä
 Arvi Tuomi as Otti

References

External links
 

1940 drama films
1940 films
Films about alcoholism
Films based on Finnish novels
Films directed by Nyrki Tapiovaara
1940s Finnish-language films
Finnish black-and-white films
Finnish drama films